

Caribbean zone

The format and dates were published on 24 June 2016.

Teams
A total of 25 teams entered the tournament.

First round

Group 1

Group 2

Group 3

Group 4

Group 5

Group 6

Ranking of second-placed teams
The best runners-up from the group stage will also qualify for the final round.

Final round

Group A

Group B

Ranking of third-placed teams
The best third-placed team from the final round group stage also qualified for the 2017 CONCACAF U-17 Championship.

Semi-finals

Third-place playoff

Final

Central American zone

The format is a single round-robin stage.  Panama qualified for the CONCACAF U-17 Championship as hosts and did not enter the qualifying competition.  In September 2016, it was announced that San José, Costa Rica would host the Central American qualifying tournament from 17 to 26 November 2016. Due to FIFA's suspension of the National Football Federation of Guatemala, Guatemela were excluded from the qualifying competition.

Matchday 4 was originally on 24 November 2016, but was brought forward by a day due to the incoming Hurricane Otto.

References

External links
Under 17s – Men, CONCACAF.com
Fútbol Masculino Sub-17, UNCAFut.com 
Men's U17, CFUfootball.org

2017 CONCACAF U-17 Championship
U-17 Championship qualifying
CONCACAF U-17 Championship qualification